Castle Biljoen lies between the Veluwe and the IJssel near Velp. This Noble House from the 16th century was rebuilt by Alexander van Spaen (1619–1692) into the present day castle with four equal corner towers.

History
The castle almost certainly originated as a large farm that was first mentioned in 1076. Only in 1530 did Charles, Duke of Guelders built a castle out of it. The towers also date from this time. From the rest of the building it has not been confirmed what is original and what is not. The family Van Spaen rebuilt the castle around the 18th century into its current state. 

In 1795 French troops were quartered in the castle. After they left the castle was plundered and the interior largely destroyed. The damage was restored with amongst others ornamental plaster and ceiling paintings.

Ownership
The estate was originally called Broekerhof, and was a place where taxes were collected. In 1076 it was donated by Henry IV, Holy Roman Emperor to the Sint-Pieter Chapter in Utrecht. In 1530 it was sold to Charles, Duke of Guelders. He in turn had to sell it again in 1535 because of debts. It came into possession of Charles' general Roelof van Lennep. Roelof's son Carl, mayor of Arnhem, inherited it in 1546. His son Roelof inherited it in turn in 1567. After family divisions it was sold to the baronial family Van Spaen in 1661. In 1849 baron Van Hardenbroek allowed Anna Pavlovna of Russia to use it temporarily. In 1872 it was inherited by the family Lüps, until 2008.

On July 25, 2008 part of the inventory of the castle was sold at Christie's in Amsterdam.

See also

List of castles in the Netherlands

External links

 mooigelderland.nl

Buildings and structures completed in 1530
Castles in Gelderland
Rijksmonuments in Gelderland
Rheden